The Elizabethtown Open was a golf tournament on the Ben Hogan Tour. It ran from 1990 to 1991. It was played at Pine Valley Country Club in Elizabethtown, Kentucky.

In 1991 the winner earned $20,000.

Winners

Former Korn Ferry Tour events
Golf in Kentucky
Recurring sporting events established in 1990
Recurring sporting events disestablished in 1991
1990 establishments in Kentucky
1991 disestablishments in Kentucky
Elizabethtown, Kentucky